U-DISE  (Unified District Information System for Education) is a database  about schools in India. The database was developed at the Department of School Education, Ministry of education, Govt. of India and Maintained by National Informatics Centre, Govt. of India. 

It records information such as the level of dropouts  and the condition of school toilets.

References

External links

Databases in India
Education in India